Great Lakes Fleet, Inc. is a shipping firm headquartered in Duluth, Minnesota that operates a fleet of nine self-unloading bulk carriers on the Great Lakes transporting dry bulk cargo such as iron ore, coal and limestone.

History 
Great Lakes Fleet was formed on July 1, 1967, when U.S. Steel consolidated its Great Lakes shipping operations by merging the Pittsburgh Steamship Division and its sister fleet, the Bradley Transportation Company forming the USS Great Lakes Fleet.

In 1981, Great Lakes Fleet was spun off into a U.S. Steel-owned subsidiary, Transtar, Inc.

Vessels
•SS Arthur M. Anderson - Last Ship to have Contact with the SS Edmund Fitzgerald

•SS John G. Munson

•MV Roger Blough

•SS Phillip R. Clark

•MV Edwin H. Gott

•MV Edgar B. Speer

References 

Great Lakes Shipping Companies
Shipping companies of the United States
Canadian National Railway subsidiaries
U.S. Steel
Companies based in Minnesota
1967 establishments in Minnesota
American companies established in 1967
Transportation in Duluth, Minnesota